Beatriz is a 1976 Spanish-Mexican drama film directed by Gonzalo Suárez and starring Jorge Rivero, Carmen Sevilla and Nadiuska.

The film's sets were designed by the art director Ramiro Gómez.

Cast
 Jorge Rivero as Ángel  
 Carmen Sevilla as Carlota  
 Nadiuska as Basilisa  
 José Sacristán  as Máximo Bretal  
 Sandra Mozarowsky as Beatriz  
 Elsa Zabala as Saludadora  
 José Lifante as Rate  
 Óscar Martín as Juan  
 Eduardo Bea as Tres Dodos 
 Pedro Luis Lavilla as Gondarin  
 Juan Antonio Peral as Pelos  
 José Luis Velasco as Cepillo  
 Sandalio Hernández as Cristamilde  
 Óscar Cortina  as Herrero

References

Bibliography
 Bentley, Bernard. A Companion to Spanish Cinema. Boydell & Brewer 2008.

External links 

1976 films
Spanish drama films
Mexican drama films
1976 drama films
1970s Spanish-language films
Films directed by Gonzalo Suárez
1970s Mexican films
1970s Spanish films